= Kosciuška =

Kosciuška is the masculine form of a Lithuanian family name. Its feminine forms are: Kosciuškienė (married woman or widow) and Kosciuškaitė (unmarried woman).

Notable people with the surname include:

- Tadas Kosciuška (1765-1794), Lithuanian name of Tadeusz Kościuszko
- Vaclovas Kosciuška (1911-1984), Lithuanian painter and graphic designer
